Gérson Andrade de Souza (born 2 January 1959) is a Brazilian sprinter. He competed in the 400 metres at the 1984 Summer Olympics and the 1988 Summer Olympics.

References

1959 births
Living people
Athletes (track and field) at the 1983 Pan American Games
Athletes (track and field) at the 1984 Summer Olympics
Athletes (track and field) at the 1987 Pan American Games
Athletes (track and field) at the 1988 Summer Olympics
Brazilian male sprinters
Olympic athletes of Brazil
Athletes from São Paulo
Pan American Games medalists in athletics (track and field)
Pan American Games silver medalists for Brazil
Pan American Games bronze medalists for Brazil
Universiade bronze medalists for Brazil
Universiade medalists in athletics (track and field)
Medalists at the 1981 Summer Universiade
Medalists at the 1983 Pan American Games
20th-century Brazilian people